George Butler (13 February 1815, Limerick – 3 February 1886, Limerick) was an Irish Roman Catholic bishop.

Butler was educated at St Patrick's College, Maynooth, and ordained in 1838. He spent his whole career in Limerick, as a curate, then a parish priest, and finally as dean of its cathedral. He was consecrated on 6 June 1864 and died in post. He received the degree of Doctor of Divinity (DD).

References

1815 births
Alumni of St Patrick's College, Maynooth
1886 deaths
20th-century Roman Catholic bishops in Ireland
Roman Catholic bishops of Limerick